Nourdine Midiladji is a politician in the Comoros. He finished 5th in the election with 9.65% in the first round of voting. He did not qualify for the run-off. He served as Minister of Solidarity under the former president Azali Assoumani from January 2003 until May 2006.

References

Living people
Year of birth missing (living people)
Government ministers of the Comoros
Candidates for President of the Comoros
Place of birth missing (living people)
21st-century Comorian people